Ralph Jady Bean (December 15, 1912 – June 7, 1978) was the Democratic President of the West Virginia Senate from Hardy County and served from 1953 to 1961.

References
Mention of Ralph J. Bean's death
Ralph J. Bean at Political Graveyard

Democratic Party West Virginia state senators
Presidents of the West Virginia State Senate
People from Hardy County, West Virginia
1912 births
1978 deaths
20th-century American politicians